Diyar Mudar is the medieval Arabic name of the westernmost of the three provinces of al-Jazira (Upper Mesopotamia), the other two being Diyar Bakr and Diyar Rabi'a. According to the medieval geographer al-Baladhuri, all three provinces were named after the main Arab tribes that were settled there by Mu'awiya I in the course of the early Muslim conquests of the 7th century. The Diyar Mudar was settled by the Mudar tribe.

Diyar Mudar encompasses the region on both banks of the middle course of the river Euphrates, from the area of Samosata to the town of Anah, and includes the area of the Balikh River and the lower reaches of the river Khabur. Its main cities were Raqqa in the south and Edessa (al-Ruha in Arabic) in the north, and other major cities included Harran, and Saruj (now Suruç).

Geographically and politically, in early Islamic times the Diyar Mudar was usually part of al-Jazira. In the mid-10th century, the region came under Hamdanid control, and under Sayf al-Dawla it was detached from the Jazira and the Hamdanids of Mosul and subordinated to the northern Syria-based Emirate of Aleppo. In the same period, the region came under attack by the resurgent Byzantine Empire.

After the loss of control of the Hamdanids, the Diyar Mudar and its cities came under the sway of the Banu Numayr, with Waththab ibn Ja'bar al-Numayri becoming autonomous governor of Harran by 1002, while Edessa was conquered by the Byzantine Empire under George Maniakes in 1032. Thereafter the region became divided into a mostly Christian-ruled northern portion, subject to Armenian colonization, while the area from Harran to the Euphrates was dominated by Arab nomadic tribes.

Seljuk raids began in the 1060s and 1070s, but it was not until 1086 that the Seljuk sultan Malik-Shah I unified the province under his control. The advent of the Crusades re-established the division between a Christian north (the County of Edessa) and a Muslim south, which lasted until the mid-12th century. The Ayyubids gained control of the region under Saladin, and kept it until the Mongol invasion of the Levant in 1260.

Sources

History of Turkey
Medieval Upper Mesopotamia
Historical regions